Van Coke Kartel  is an Afrikaans alternative rock band from Bellville, near Cape Town, South Africa.

Band history
Francois Van Coke and Wynand Myburgh formed Van Coke Kartel with drummer Justin Kruger after Fokofpolisiekar went on hiatus in 2007. Guitarist Jedd Kossew and drummer Jason Oosthuizen joined as full members in 2010. However in 2014, Jason Oosthuizen left the band. Their new drummer Dylan Hunt started in January 2014.

Notable achievements
Van Coke Kartel has been one of the most successful Afrikaans rock bands in South Africa. The second album, Waaksaam en Wakker, won the SAMA award for Best Afrikaans Rock Album, for which their self-titled debut album was nominated the year before. They have played alongside international heavyweights, such as Muse, Thirty Seconds to Mars, Korn, Chris Cornell, Good Charlotte, Billy Talent and Metallica. They have also toured internationally.

Awards

Discography
 Van Coke Kartel (2007)
 Waaksaam en Wakker (2008)
 Skop, Skiet en Donner (2010)
 Wie's Bang (2011)
 Bloed, Sweet & Trane (2013)
 Energie EP (2015)

References

External links 
 

Musical groups established in 2007
South African alternative rock groups